Zovenj (also Romanized as Zavanj; also known as Zanaj, Zanech, Zonj, and Zownj) is a village in Negel Rural District, Kalatrazan District, Sanandaj County, Kurdistan Province, Iran. At the 2006 census, its population was 741, in 179 families. The village is populated by Kurds.

References 

Towns and villages in Sanandaj County
Kurdish settlements in Kurdistan Province